Parasemionotus is an extinct genus of prehistoric bony fish that lived in the Induan age of the Early Triassic epoch in what is now Madagascar. It is the name giving genus of the family Parasemionotidae and the order Parasemionotiformes. This clade includes, among others, the genera Albertonia, Candelarialepis, Jacobulus, Lehmanotus, Qingshania, Stensioenotus, Suius, Thomasinotus, Watsonulus, and possibly additional genera like Promecosomina. Parasemionotiforms had a global distribution during the Early Triassic. Species of this family are found in Greenland, Madagascar, Canada, India, China, United States, and possibly Australia.

The type species Parasemionotus labordei was first described under the name Semionotus labordei by Ferdinand Priem. Jean Piveteau later erected the new genus name Parasemionotus for this species. It is not closely related with Semionotus.

See also

 Prehistoric fish
 List of prehistoric bony fish

References

Parasemionotiformes
Early Triassic fish
Prehistoric animals of Madagascar
Extinct animals of Europe
Prehistoric ray-finned fish genera